The 2003 Melbourne Cup was the 143rd running of the Melbourne Cup, a prestigious Australian Thoroughbred horse race.

It was won by Makybe Diva at the age of five, trained by David Hall and ridden by Glen Boss.

Field

This is a list of horses which ran in the 2003 Melbourne Cup.

References

2003
Melbourne Cup
Melbourne Cup
2000s in Melbourne
November 2003 sports events in Australia